Valeurs actuelles is a French weekly news magazine published in Paris. It was initially considered to be right-wing but is today associated with the far right. It was founded by Raymond Bourgine in 1966.

History
Valeurs actuelles was founded in 1966 by Raymond Bourgine as an offspring of the weekly Finances, a stock market information review. The magazine gradually became an opinion and generalist publication with a liberal-conservative tendency. In 1971 Valeurs actuelles was relaunched. 

Formerly owned by Socpresse the magazine has been owned by Valmonde, a subsidiary of Sud Communication. The company is owned by Pierre Fabre, who founded Laboratoires Pierre Fabre.

The main articles of the magazine are the editorial, written by François d'Orcival; the lettre de M. de Rastignac ("Rastignac's letter"), a humour piece about French politics that comments on present politicians by calling them by names of supporting characters from Balzac's works. 

From 1966 to his death in 1972, the movie section was written by the antisemitic and collaborationist writer Lucien Rebatet, under the pseudonym of François Vinneuil.

In 2014, Valeurs actuelles published a false survey favorable to Nicolas Sarkozy. Valeurs actuelles also leaked informations about journalists from the newspaper Le Monde who were investigating on Nicolas Sarkozy, which triggers the accusation of breach of the secrecy of the sources of a dozen French newspapers.

In 2019, President Emmanuel Macron gave the magazine an interview and talked critically about Islam, the veil and immigration with the publication. This created much fury from left-wing politicians. 

Macron defended his interview by saying he wanted to reach out to other audiences as well. He called Valeurs actuelles "a very good magazine, you have to read it to know what the right thinks".

In August 2020, Valeurs actuelles published an illustration of the black Member of Parliament Danièle Obono as a slave in chains as part of a political fiction series on public figures transposed in different historical eras, prompting an outcry from politicians of numerous parties. Deputy editor Tagdual Denis apologised for the image but denied accusations of racism. Valeurs actuelles must be judged for a racist insult in 2021. The magazine was found guilty of making racist comments under French hate speech rules against Danièle Obono, 41, the Member of Parliament for Paris's 17th constituency the far-left France Unbowed party.

In 2021, a few months after the murder of Samuel Paty, Valeurs actuelles publishes a fake news about a professor who would be threatened with death by his students because of the study of the Holocaust.

In 2021, on Algiers putsch birthday, the magazine published an open letter by retired military personnel, who warned the country was heading for "civil war" due to Islamist religious extremism, and hinted at the possibility of a military coup. They are close to the extreme right and conspiratorial circles of the great replacement and the National Rally. For the political scientist specializing in the far right Jean-Yves Camus, an intervention by the army in favor of the far right remains a fantasy fueled by a very small and retired army movement, and not a real threat.

Circulation

Valeurs actuelles is mostly distributed to subscribers. Its circulation in 1981 was 113,000 copies. The estimated circulation of the magazine was 90,000 copies in 1988.

Contributors
Major contributors to the magazine include the following:
 Michel Gurfinkiel, editor-in-chief from 1985 to 2006, now editor-at-large.
 Paul-Marie Coûteaux, former MPF-affiliated MEP (1999-2009)
 Olivier Dassault, UMP deputy of the National Assembly
 Chantal Delsol
 Laurent Dandrieu
 Gilles-William Goldnadel
 Catherine Nay
 John Rees
 Philippe de Saint Robert
 Philippe Tesson
 Denis Tillinac
 Jean Tulard

References

External links
 
 Official website
 Official blog

1966 establishments in France
Conservative magazines
French-language magazines
News magazines published in France
Weekly magazines published in France
Magazines established in 1966
Magazines published in Paris